The Cadillac Ciel is a hybrid electric concept car created by Cadillac and unveiled at the 2011 Pebble Beach Concours d'Elegance. The Ciel has a twin-turbocharged 3.6-liter direct injection V6 producing  and a hybrid system using lithium-ion battery technology. It was developed at GM Design's North Hollywood Design Center.

The Ciel comes with rear suicide doors, and the interior features a smooth wooden dashboard with a simple gauge look. The word "Ciel" is French for "sky"- which is what the designers had in mind when they made the vehicle. 

In 2012 and early 2013, Cadillac contemplated developing a production car based on the Ciel. However, in July 2013, they decided not to pursue the venture. 

At the 2013 Pebble Beach Concours d'Elegance, Cadillac unveiled a new concept, the Cadillac Elmiraj, which is similar in design to the Ciel, except it is a coupe. Both vehicles were designed by Niki Smart. 

The Cadillac Ciel was featured in the 2015 movie adaptation of Entourage as a gift from talent agent Ari Gold to the main character Vincent Chase for the success of his directorial debut in the fictional movie, Hyde.

See also

Cadillac Converj
Cadillac XLR

References

External links 
 

Ciel
Hybrid electric cars
Full-size vehicles
Luxury vehicles
Convertibles